Remigijus Žemaitaitis (born 30 May 1982) is a Lithuanian politician and member of the Seimas.

Biography
Žemaitaitis was born on 30 May 1982 in Šilutė. In 2005, he graduated from the Faculty of Law at the Vilnius University. Until 2007 he worked as a lawyer and assistant at courts. Between 2007 and 2009 he worked as an assistant to the mayor of Vilnius and, later, a member of the European Parliament Juozas Imbrasas and former President of Lithuania Rolandas Paksas.

A member of the Order and Justice party, Žemaitaitis was elected to the Tenth Seimas in 2009, in the by-election in the single-seat constituency of Šilutė-Šilalė. He was reelected to the Eleventh Seimas in 2012. He was elected the chairman of the Economics Committee at the parliament.

In elections in 2016, Žemaitaitis headed the electoral list of Order and Justice. After these elections, party's leader Rolandas Paksas resigned. Žemaitaitis became the interim leader of the party.

In 2018, the party suffered splits and its support declined. After 2019 presidential election, the Order and Justice joined the Lithuanian Farmers and Greens Union-led government. According coalition's agreement, Žemaitaitis became the Deputy Speaker of Seimas. Two months later, the Order and Justice parliamentary group dissolved itself and Žemaitaitis became unaffiliated member of Seimas. In November, 2019, Žemaitaitis was removed from the Deputy Speaker's position after vote of no confidence.

In 2020, the Lithuanian Freedom Union (Liberals), the Order and Justice and the movement "Forward, Lithuania" merged into party the Freedom and Justice. Žemaitaitis was elected its leader.

References

1982 births
Living people
Members of the Seimas
People from Šilutė District Municipality
21st-century Lithuanian politicians
Order and Justice politicians
Freedom and Justice politicians
Vilnius University alumni